The 1988 World Men's Curling Championship took place at the Icehalle in Lausanne, Switzerland from April 11–17. The gold medal was won by Team Norway, who also won the Curling competition in the 1988 Olympics in Calgary, Canada. Canada took the silver medal, and Scotland the bronze.

Teams

Round-robin standings

Round-robin results

Draw 1

Draw 2

Draw 3

Draw 4

Draw 5

Draw 6

Draw 7

Draw 8

Draw 9

Tiebreakers

Playoffs

Semifinals

Bronze medal match

Gold medal match

References
General

Specific

World Men's Curling Championship
W
C
C
International curling competitions hosted by Switzerland
20th century in Lausanne
Sports competitions in Lausanne
Hexagon World Men's Curling Championship